Ovchukhi is a rural locality (a selo) in Pavlovskoye Rural Settlement, Suzdalsky District, Vladimir Oblast, Russia. The population was 153 as of 2010. There are 8 streets.

Geography 
Ovchukhi is located on the right bank of the Rpen River, 33 km southwest of Suzdal (the district's administrative centre) by road. Brutovo is the nearest rural locality.

References 

Rural localities in Suzdalsky District
Vladimirsky Uyezd